This is a list of football (soccer) clubs in Egypt.
This article is incomplete.

For a complete list see :Category:Football clubs in Egypt

See also 
Egyptian Premier League 
Egyptian Super Cup
 List of Egyptian football players in foreign leagues

 
Egypt
clubs
Football clubs